"Those Kinds of Things" is the first episode of the sixth season of Showtime TV series Dexter. It was aired on October 2, 2011 and attracted 2.19 million viewers in the US.

Plot
Dexter is shown writhing in pain. He calls 911 and requests paramedics for what he says is a stab wound. It turns out that it was all a part of his plan to trap two specific paramedics who have been letting patients die so that their organs can be harvested and sold for huge profits on the local black market. Dexter then charges up a defibrillator and shocks each paramedic until they're both dead.

A year after Rita's death, Dexter's life is back to normal, or at least as normal as his life gets. Batista's sister Jamie has become Harrison's babysitter, and she takes care of Harrison whenever Dexter is away from home. Dexter and Debra visit a Catholic pre-school which they plan on having Harrison attend.

Back at Miami Metro, María LaGuerta is promoted to captain. It is revealed that LaGuerta blackmailed Deputy Chief Matthews, whose name was on a prostitute's ledger, to give her the promotion. Vince Masuka has taken up the responsibility of teaching a group of forensic science students, eventually hiring Ryan Chambers as his intern. Batista and Laguerta have divorced, but remain friends. Meanwhile, Dexter attends his high school reunion on the suspicion that the high school quarterback had murdered his wife, whom Dexter remembers fondly (she had been one of the few people to treat Dexter with kindness during high school), and is surprised to find himself getting along with his former classmates, with Trisha Billings, a very attractive woman who used to copy Dexter's answers in class, giving him a "thank you" in the form of oral sex. After obtaining the quarterback's blood and finding a perfect DNA match from the wife's murder scene records (from underneath her fingernails), Dexter realizes his instincts were right all along. He later traps the man, is not impressed with his rationalizations for the murder, and kills him.

Quinn prepares to propose to Debra, only to be interrupted by a shooter in the restaurant. Debra exchanges fire with the perpetrator and then tackles him, making her a local hero.

This episode introduces the season's primary antagonists, Travis Marshall and Professor Gellar, two serial killers who base their murders on passages from the Book of Revelation; they believe they have been chosen by God to bring about the apocalypse. They kill a fruit vendor, replace his intestines with snakes, and stitch him with a symbol of alpha and omega.

Reception
The episode received mixed to generally positive reviews from critics.The A.V. Club gave the episode a B− grade, stating "“Those Kinds of Things” wasn’t much of an episode. "The opening scene was terrific, though it was a bit disappointing to see that it wasn’t legitimate in medias res, just the double execution of a pair of organ harvesting EMTs to establish that for Dexter, it’s back to business as usual. He’s back in the bachelor pad, which is now massive since he’s purchased the apartment next to his".

IGN gave the episode an 8/10 rating, commenting "'Those Kinds of Things' set things up neatly and right now Dexter and the major villains are in separate corners. At this point, six years in, this isn't landmark stuff though. For everyone who's come in and out of Dexter's life, and whose somewhat disposable characters were supposed to 'play a role in his evolution,' the Bay Harbor butcher still seems mostly un-evolved. Especially considering all those who might feel that this episode is a "return to form". Still, it's always a good thing when Dexter Morgan pops back up in our lives and every new season comes scented with a lovely hint of macabre merriment."

References

External links
 Dexter's official website on Showtime
 

Dexter (TV series) episodes
2011 American television episodes
Television episodes directed by John Dahl